Grantha may refer to:
 Grantha script, a Malayalam and Tamil script used to write Sanskrit and Manipravalam in Malayalam-speaking regions and Tamil-speaking regions
 Grantha (Unicode block), a Unicode block containing the ancient Grantha script characters
 Guru Granth Sahib, the central religious scripture of Sikhism